Alexandre Charles Perrégaux (21 October 1791 - 6 November 1837) was a French Army officer who participated in the French conquest of Algeria.

Family 
Alexandre Charles Perrégaux was born in Neuchâtel on 21 October 1791, the second son of Charles Albert Henri Perregaux (1757-1831) who was state councilor, colonel inspector of militias and knight of the red eagle.

He had married Cécile de Pourtalès in Neuchâtel on 5 December 1825. Cécile, who was born on 9 September 1804, predeceased her husband, dying in Paris on 24 March 1830. The couple had no surviving children.

Injury and death 
Perrégaux took part in the Expedition of the Col des Beni Aïcha, and was present at the Siege of Constantine on 12 October 1837 when General Charles-Marie Denys de Damrémont was killed by a cannonball. While attempting to reach Damrémont and recover his body, Perrégaux was struck by a bullet which passed through his nose and into the palate of his mouth. He was knocked unconscious and wounded on Damrémont's body.

Perregaux was rushed back by his soldiers to the town of Annaba, and embarked on a boat to take him back to France. He died at sea while crossing the Mediterranean.

The boat carrying him docked in a port on the island of Sardinia, and he was buried in a cemetery in the city of Cagliari.

Bibliography

References

1791 births
People from Neuchâtel
19th-century Swiss military personnel
1837 deaths
People who died at sea
Deaths in Italy
French Army officers
French Algeria
1830s in Algeria
Grand Officiers of the Légion d'honneur